Thomas Tanner (1630–1682) was an English clergyman and writer, the author of The Entrance of Mazzarini (Oxford, 1657–58).

He was educated at St Paul's School, London, and at Pembroke Hall, Cambridge. He became a barrister and later a clergyman, being vicar of Colyton, Devon, and afterwards of Winchfield, Hampshire.

References

External links

1630 births
1682 deaths
People educated at St Paul's School, London
Alumni of Pembroke College, Cambridge
17th-century English Anglican priests
English non-fiction writers
English male non-fiction writers